The 2006 French Figure Skating Championships took place between 9 and 11 December 2005 in Besançon. Skaters competed in the disciplines of men's singles, women's singles, pair skating, and ice dancing on the senior level. The event was used to help determine the French team to the 2006 Winter Olympics, the 2006 World Championships, and the 2006 European Championships.

Results

Men

Ladies

Pairs

Ice dancing

External links
 results

French Figure Skating Championships, 2006
French Figure Skating Championships, 2006
French Figure Skating Championships
2006 in French sport
French Figure Skating Championships